Lothian Schools Strathspey and Reel Society (L.S.S.R.S. for short) is an amateur Scottish fiddle orchestra based in Edinburgh, Scotland. The society consists of around 30 fiddlers, 2 cellists and currently 2 double bassists. They play at many concerts throughout the year and also attend the Kirriemuir Fiddle Festival every November, which, for the last two years running, they have won the large group competition and last year won the quartet competition.

Aims
The aims of the society are as follows;

To foster the playing of Scottish fiddle music by young people.

To encourage an interest in Scottish music and dance.

To give public performances.

To take part in musical competitions and displays.

To participate in tours or special events related to these aims.

History
As part of the movement to preserve and develop Scottish traditional fiddle playing the Lothian Schools Strathspey and Reel Society was formed in 1983 by its conductor Yla Steven. Its membership is drawn from pupils attending schools in Lothian who meet weekly to rehearse their skills. The current membership is around 40.

In 1984 the group went to Munich representing the Lothian Region in the celebrations which marked the 30th anniversary of the twinning of the two cities, Edinburgh and Munich.

In 1985 they represented Lothian Region again, this time at the Scottish Schools Prom Concert in the Usher Hall, Edinburgh. This concert was presented to commemorate European Music Year and was broadcast on television by BBC Scotland.

For several years now the Lothian Schools Strathspey and Reel Society has competed at the Kirrimuir Fiddle Festival, one of the top festivals of its kind in Scotland, and many of its members past and present have featured in the prize list for both solo and group performances. 2000 was a particularly successful year - winning the orchestra competition. However, the orchestra has won this 3 times, and is now recognised as one of  the top strathspey and reel societies in Scotland.

The Lothian Schools Strathspey and Reel Society has hosted many "Fiddlers' Rallies" all over Scotland - the Scottish Exhibition and Conference Centre, Glasgow, the Whitehall theatre, Dundee, and most frequently in Falkirk Town Hall where there is a Youth Music Festival at Easter time.

In 1988 and 1989 the L.S.S.R.S. took part in the Festival of British Youth Orchestras which takes place during the Edinburgh International Festival. In 1989 they were also invited to the Aberdeen International Youth Festival to take part in "A Taste of Scotland" staged in His Majesty's Theatre. This performance was shown on Grampian Television. Later the same year they were invited to play at Blair Castle during the finals of the Glenfiddich Scottish Fiddle Championships.

In 1992 the L.S.S.R.S. made their first Canadian appearance with a tour of Alberta. They started in Edmonton - played in the Mall, then Red Deer for their Highland Games, Banff for Canada Day - Banff Springs Hotel!, and finally Calgary where they marched in the Stampede Parade and performed on the Centennial Stage.

1993 saw another breakthrough in their impressive record when they played nightly for three and a half weeks for the Scottish Country Dancers at the Edinburgh Military Tattoo.

Foreign travel was on the agenda again in 1994. This time it was a tour of the Argentine where they were guests of St. Andrew's College, Buenos Aires.

In 1996 the L.S.S.R.S. were the fiddle orchestra who took part in the Robert Burns Spectacular Concert in Glasgow marking the bi-centenary of the poet's death.

In 1998 the L.S.S.R.S. made a return visit to Canada playing this time in Vancouver, Creston, Calgary, Banff, Medicine Hat, Toronto and also Ann Arbor in Michigan, United States.

In 1999 and 2000 the L.S.S.R.S. acted as "hosts" to the Fiddlers Philharmonic from Ann Arbor and New Tradition from Shetland.

In 2000 they also took part in the Spirit of Youth Concert in Falkirk Town Hall.

2001 saw the Spirit of Youth Concert move to the Glasgow Royal Concert Hall - this time it was televised and broadcast in 2002. Between them these concerts have raised over £50,000 for CHAS (Child Hospice Association of Scotland).

In 2008 the society completed another successful tour of Canada, this time visiting Calgary, Banff, Medicine Hat, Regina, Drumheller, and Edmonton.

External links
Official website

Scottish orchestras